Paul Foley may refer to:
Paul Foley (ironmaster) (1644/5–1699), English ironmaster who also served as Speaker of the British House of Commons
Paul Foley (politician) (1688–1739), English politician, second son of the ironmaster
Paul Foley of Prestwood (died 1739), eldest son of Philip Foley
Paul Foley (cricketer) (1857–1928), English cricketer, cricket administrator and barrister
Paul Foley (admiral) (1909–1990), rear admiral in the United States Navy
Paul Foley (executive) (1914–1983), American CEO of Interpublic Group of Companies
Paul Foley (golfer) (born 1959), Australian golfer
Paul Foley, ambassador of Australia to Afghanistan (2009–2012)
Paul "Eagle Eye" Foley, a playable character in the Conflict series